The 1960 Summer Olympics medal table is a list of National Olympic Committees ranked by the number of medals won during the 1960 Summer Olympics, held in Rome, Italy from August 25 to September 11, 1960. 

A total of 5,338 athletes from 83 countries participated in these Games, competing in 150 events in 17 sports.

Athletes from 44 countries won at least one medal, leaving 39 countries in blank in the medal table.  The Soviet Union won the most gold (43) and overall medals (103). British West Indies, Republic of China, Ethiopia, Ghana, Iraq, Morocco, and Singapore  won the first medals in their Olympic history.

Medal table
The ranking in this table is based on information provided by the International Olympic Committee, although that organization does not officially recognize global ranking per country.

The countries are ranked by the number of gold medals won by the athletes of that country. If countries are tied, first the number of silver medals is taken into consideration and then the number of bronze medals. If, after the above, countries are still tied, equal ranking is given and they are listed alphabetically.

A total of 150 events in 17 sports were awarded in Rome. In gymnastics, two extra gold medals were awarded in the men's pommel horse and long horse vault events because of ties and one additional bronze medal was awarded in the Rings event. Because of this, two fewer silver medals were awarded, though an extra silver was awarded in the women's high jump. In the boxing events, two bronze medals were awarded in each weight class, so the total number of bronze medals is greater than the total number of gold and silver medals.

See also
 1960 Summer Paralympics medal table

References

External links
 
 
 
 
 
 
 

Medal count
Summer Olympics medal tables